The 31st Guldbagge Awards ceremony, presented by the Swedish Film Institute, honored the best Swedish films of 1995, and took place on February 12, 1996. Lust och fägring stor directed by Bo Widerberg was presented with the award for Best Film.

Winner and nominees

Awards

Notes and references

External links
Official website
31st Guldbagge Awards at Internet Movie Database

1996 in Sweden
1995 film awards
Guldbagge Awards ceremonies
1990s in Stockholm